Steph Hodgins-May is a Greenpeace activist who has been a candidate for the Australian Greens in multiple federal elections.

Early life and career 
Hodgins-May was raised in Blampied in rural Victoria on a farm. Her father was a mayor of the local shire.
 
Her mother was a media studies and drama teacher in Ballarat.
 
She has a law arts degree and master in international relations from Deakin University.
 
Hodgins-May founded the Vivien Hodgins Foundation in honour of her mother's commitment to education, and raised over $40,000 to assist disaster relief efforts for Samoa. She worked in particular on micro-finance projects for local women-led businesses.

She worked in property law before working in the Australian mission to the United Nations. She was also her father's business partner in their family's farm. Following the 2019 election, Hodgins-May took up a position as Greenpeace's head of Pacific. In this position she pushed for Australia to do more to prevent climate change and to help the Pacific Islands with the challenges that climate change causes.

Political candidate

2013 election 
Hodgins-May first ran for elected office at the 2013 election for the division of Ballarat, a safe Labor seat. She won 9.5% of the vote.

2016 election 
At the 2016 election, Hodgins-May contested the inner Melbourne seat of Melbourne Ports, a seat held by Labor since 1906. In a three cornered contest between the Greens, Labor and Liberal, Hodgins-May secured 23.79% of the primary vote. The results of the election remained uncertain, with Hodgins-May closing in on the incumbent, Michael Danby with a strong preference flow. However, Danby received strong support in the postal votes, and was ahead by fewer than 1000 votes on the seventh count of preferences. Hodgins-May was eliminated at that point, and her preferences allowed Danby to prevail in the final count over the Liberal candidate, Owen Guest.

Zionism Victoria forum 
During the 2016 election campaign, Hodgins-May was invited with the other two major party candidates, Michael Danby and Owen Guest, to participate in a candidates' forum for the Jewish community, which makes up a significant part of the division of Melbourne Ports. The event was co-sponsored by Zionism Victoria (ZV) and The Australian Jewish News (AJN).

After initially accepting the invitation, Hodgins-May declined to turn up citing the fact that ZV was a co-sponsor of the event. The cited reason was stated as the political stances taken by ZV against the United Nations.
 
The decision at the time was seen as a slight against the Jewish community and as taking sides in the Israeli–Palestinian conflict, although Hodgins-May subsequently accepted a number of invitations to speak at a number of other Jewish and Zionist organisations. The policy position of the Greens with regards to the conflict was almost indistinguishable from the Labor party, whose candidate, Danby was the eventual winner. However some members of the Jewish community saw this move as a 'slap in the face' to the whole community.
 
Hodgins-May subsequently apologised to the community saying "I will say that I’ve certainly never been accused of being a bigot or anti-Semitic or anti-Zionist and I understand that that is how a lot of people felt and were quite hurt and for that, I do sincerely apologise. I really do. I did not mean to cause that hurt and offense to your community."
 
The incident continued to be mentioned by Jewish publications in subsequent elections, especially the AJN, who were co-sponsors of the event in question, mentioning the incident often during subsequent election campaigns in 2019 and 2022.

2019 election 
Hodgins-May was the Greens Party candidate for the division of Macnamara, the renamed former Division of Melbourne Ports, for the 2019 Election.
 
While campaigning for the election, Hodgins-May secured the endorsement of Gillian Triggs, who was the Australian human rights commissioner until 2017. The endorsement was a personal one and not an endorsement of the party as a whole. Triggs came under fire from both the Liberal and Labor parties for giving the endorsement.
 
During the campaign, Hodgins-May was attacked by Jewish groups because one of her staff tweeted something critical of Israel during fighting in the Gaza Strip. Hodgins-May was critical of the staffer, but refused to remove him from the campaign.
 
While Hodgins-May increased her vote marginally, the new Labor candidate, Josh Burns increased his primary vote significantly, while the Liberal Party vote fell, meaning Burns won the seat comfortably.

2022 election 
Hodgins-May was again preselected for the Greens in the Melbourne seat of Macnamara for the 2022 election. It was one of the key seats that the Greens were targeting in their hopes of increasing their representation in parliament.

Hodgins-May increased her primary vote and finished second in primary votes behind Labor, but was unsuccessful.

Political positions 
Hodgins-May has taken a strong stance on climate policy, and has called on successive governments to do more. She has argued that government inaction has caused Australia to become a global pariah when it came to issues around the environment.
 
She is also an advocate for Australia increasing its foreign aid budget and to focus more on international development.

Personal life 
Hodgins-May lives in Elwood with her partner Ogy and has a son, Otis.
 
Hodgins-May's mother died in the 2009 Samoan tsunami while holidaying at a local resort.
 
Her father was killed in a traffic accident in 2017. Her father, Rod May, was on a motorbike, while the driver of the car had methamphetamines in his system and was disqualified from driving at the time.

References 

Living people
Candidates for Australian federal elections
Australian women lawyers
Australian women in politics
People from Melbourne
Year of birth missing (living people)
21st-century Australian lawyers
Australian Greens candidates